In thermodynamics, the Gibbs–Duhem equation describes the relationship between changes in chemical potential for components in a thermodynamic system:

where  is the number of moles of component  the infinitesimal increase in chemical potential for this component,  the entropy,  the absolute temperature,  volume and  the pressure.  is the number of different components in the system. This equation shows that in thermodynamics intensive properties are not independent but related, making it a mathematical statement of the state postulate. When pressure and temperature are variable, only  of  components have independent values for chemical potential and Gibbs' phase rule follows. The Gibbs−Duhem equation cannot be used for small thermodynamic systems due to the influence of surface effects and other microscopic phenomena.

The equation is named after Josiah Willard Gibbs and Pierre Duhem.

Derivation

Deriving the Gibbs–Duhem equation from the fundamental thermodynamic equation is straightforward. The total differential of the extensive Gibbs free energy  in terms of its natural variables is

Since the Gibbs free energy is the Legendre transformation of the internal energy, the derivatives can be replaced by their definitions, transforming the above equation into:

The chemical potential is simply another name for the partial molar Gibbs free energy (or the partial Gibbs free energy, depending on whether N is in units of moles or particles). Thus the Gibbs free energy of a system can be calculated by collecting moles together carefully at a specified T, P and at a constant molar ratio composition (so that the chemical potential doesn't change as the moles are added together), i.e.

.

The total differential of this expression is

Combining the two expressions for the total differential of the Gibbs free energy gives

which simplifies to the Gibbs–Duhem relation:

Alternative derivation 
Another way of deriving the Gibbs-Duhem equation can be found be taking the extensivity of energy into account. Extensivity implies that

where  denotes all extensive variables of the internal energy . The internal energy is thus a first-order homogenous function. Applying Euler's homogeneous function theorem, one finds the following relation when taking only volume, number of particles, and entropy as extensive variables:

Taking the total differential, one finds

Applications
By normalizing the above equation by the extent of a system, such as the total number of moles, the Gibbs–Duhem equation provides a relationship between the intensive variables of the system. For a simple system with  different components, there will be  independent parameters or "degrees of freedom". For example, if we know a gas cylinder filled with pure nitrogen is at room temperature (298 K) and 25 MPa, we can determine the fluid density (258 kg/m3), enthalpy (272 kJ/kg), entropy (5.07 kJ/kg⋅K) or any other intensive thermodynamic variable. If instead the cylinder contains a nitrogen/oxygen mixture, we require an additional piece of information, usually the ratio of oxygen-to-nitrogen.

If multiple phases of matter are present, the chemical potentials across a phase boundary are equal. Combining expressions for the Gibbs–Duhem equation in each phase and assuming systematic equilibrium (i.e. that the temperature and pressure is constant throughout the system), we recover the Gibbs' phase rule.

One particularly useful expression arises when considering binary solutions. At constant P (isobaric) and T (isothermal) it becomes:

or, normalizing by total number of moles in the system  substituting in the definition of activity coefficient  and using the identity :

 

This equation is instrumental in the calculation of thermodynamically consistent and thus more accurate expressions for the vapor pressure of a fluid mixture from limited experimental data.

Ternary and multicomponent solutions and mixtures

Lawrence Stamper Darken has shown that the Gibbs-Duhem equation can be applied to the determination of chemical potentials of components from a multicomponent system from experimental data regarding the chemical potential  of only one component (here component 2) at all compositions. He has deduced the following relation

xi, amount (mole) fractions of components.

Making some rearrangements and dividing by (1 – x2)2 gives:

or

or 

 as formatting variant

The derivative with respect to one mole fraction x2 is taken at constant ratios of amounts (and therefore of mole fractions) of the other components of the solution representable in a diagram like ternary plot.

Applying LHopital's rule gives:

.

This becomes further:

.

Express the mole fractions of component 1 and 3 as functions of component 2 mole fraction and binary mole ratios:

and the sum of partial molar quantities

gives 

These constants can be obtained from the previous equality by putting the complementary mole fraction x3 = 0 for x1 and vice versa.

Thus 

and 

The final expression is given by substitution of these constants into the previous equation:

See also 
 Margules activity model
 Darken's equations
 Gibbs–Helmholtz equation

References

External links 
J. Phys. Chem. Gokcen 1960
 A lecture from www.chem.neu.edu
 A lecture from www.chem.arizona.edu
 Encyclopædia Britannica entry

Chemical thermodynamics
Thermodynamic equations

fr:Potentiel chimique#Relation de Gibbs-Duhem